Occupation of the Latvian Republic Day is an official day of remembrance in Latvia and is observed on June 17. It commemorates the Soviet occupation of Latvia in 1940.

Overview
On June 17, 1940 Soviet troops invaded Latvia and occupied bridges, post/telephone, telegraph, and broadcasting offices. On the same day, Andrei Vishinski, Deputy Chairman of the Council of People's Commissars of the Soviet Union, introduced himself to President Kārlis Ulmanis as Soviet special envoy; two days later, Vishinski visited Ulmanis again, this time, to deliver the list, pre-approved by Moscow, of the new members of the cabinet of the Latvian government. Soon after, State administrators were liquidated and replaced by Soviet cadres, in which 34,250 Latvians were deported or killed and Latvia was incorporated into the Soviet Union as The Latvian Soviet Socialist Republic.

Soviet Occupation Day became an official remembrance day on May 18, 2000.

Moldova's interim president Mihai Ghimpu instituted in 2010 the Soviet Occupation Day holiday to remember the Soviet occupation on June 28, 1940, but the Constitutional Court cancelled his decree on July 12, 2010. Georgia followed the example and declared February 25 Soviet Occupation Day to recall the Red Army invasion of Georgia in 1921.

See also 
 Soviet occupation of Latvia in 1940
 Occupation of the Baltic states
 Red Army invasion of Georgia
 Soviet occupation of Bessarabia and Northern Bukovina

References

External links
  Soviet Occupation Remembered in Riga
 Rihards Treijs "Par Latvijas okupāciju 1940.gadā"
 Latvijas Avīze "17. jūnijs – Latvijas Republikas okupācijas diena" (17.06.09.)
 "Latvijas okupācija:vēsturiskie un starptautiski tiesiskie aspekti"
 AllMoldova.md:  "June 28 declared Day of Soviet Occupation'", 24 June 2010
 RIA Novosti: "Moldova 'virtually cancels' decree on Soviet Occupation Day", 28 June 2010
 RFE/RL: "'Soviet Occupation Day' Causes Rift In Moldova's Ruling Alliance",  3 July 2010

Remembrance days
June observances
1940 in the Soviet Union
1940 in Latvia
2009 in Latvia
Alliance for European Integration